Razgor is a village in the Municipality of Vojnik in eastern Slovenia. The area is part of the traditional region of Styria. It is now included with the rest of the municipality in the Savinja Statistical Region.

References

External links
Razgor at Geopedia

Populated places in the Municipality of Vojnik